In botany, a spadix (plural spadices) is a type of inflorescence having small flowers borne on a fleshy stem. Spadices are typical of the family Araceae, the arums or aroids. The spadix is typically surrounded by a leaf-like curved bract known as a spathe. For example, the "flower" of the well known Anthurium spp. is a typical spadix with a large colorful spathe.

In this type of inflorescence, peduncle is thick, long and fleshy, having small sessile unisexual flowers covered with one or more large green or colourful bracts (spathe). Spadix inflorescence is found in colocasia, aroids, maize and palms (palms have compound spadix).

Monoecious aroids have unisexual male and female flowers on the same individual and the spadix is usually organized with female flowers towards the bottom and male flowers towards the top. Typically, the stigmas are no longer receptive when pollen is released which prevents self-fertilization. 

In the compound spadix inflorescence, the axis is branched. Usually the whole inflorescence is covered by a stiff boat shaped hood, for example the coconut (palms).

Gallery

References

Further reading

Plant morphology
Pollination